Mohamed Mahmoud Pasha (1877 – 1941), also knowns as Mohamed Mahmoud Khalil Pasha, was Prime Minister of Egypt twice.

Mahmoud was Minister of Finance from 1927 to 1928. He first became Prime Minister from June 27, 1928 to October 4, 1929, running under the Liberal Constitutional Party. When he left office, Sir Percy Lyham Loraine led Egypt as Governor General for two months until a new Prime Minister could be elected. 

He was one of the signatories to the Anglo-Egyptian Treaty of 1936. 

Later, after Egypt became an independent kingdom, Mahmoud again was elected, this time as a member of the Wafd Party. This term lasted from December 29, 1937 to August 18, 1939. 

A street was named after him in central Cairo, close to Tahrir Square.

References

External links
 

1877 births
1941 deaths
20th-century prime ministers of Egypt
Prime Ministers of Egypt
Finance Ministers of Egypt
Wafd Party politicians
Egyptian pashas